Kelly Chan may refer to:

 Kelly Chan (windsurfer) (1956–1998), Singaporean windsurfer
 Kelly Chen (born 1972), or Chan, Hong Kong singer-actress